Pokhvistnevo railway station is a mainline railway station located in Pokhvistnevo, Samara Oblast, Russia. It is part of the Kuybyshev Railway, on the line between Samara railway station and Ufa Station. It is located in the town centre.

History
A station at Pokhvistnevo was first opened on 8 September 1888 as part of the Samara-Ufa railway, and the beginnings of a rail line between Samara and Zlatoust. The present station building dates from 1905, and has been rebuilt several times since, but retaining its original form. It is an example of Renaissance Revival architecture, and has a 24.3 metre symmetrical facade. The station was built in the historical centre of the town, and in pre-revolutionary times had four fountains and a greenhouse in front of the station's entrance.

The station underwent a major overhaul in 2010, with the external facade being reconstructed and restored to its appearance as it was in the early 20th century, using contemporary drawings and photographs.

Services
The station and its services are operated by Russian Railways. More than 80 long-distance and suburban trains pass through Pokhvistnevo station daily.

Long-distance services

References 

Railway stations in Samara Oblast
Railway stations in the Russian Empire opened in 1888